Lauren Nicole London (born December 5, 1984) is an American actress. London is known for her roles in films and televisions shows including ATL (2006), This Christmas (2007), Madea's Big Happy Family (2011), Baggage Claim (2013), The Game (2013-2015), Games People Play (2019), Without Remorse (2021), and You People (2023).

In 2022, London and PUMA collaborated on the L.A Love Story project. The footwear and apparel collection is inspired by her hometown, Los Angeles. Items also feature her late boyfriend Nipsey Hussle, who was fatally shot on March 31, 2019 in Los Angeles.

Early life
London was born to an African-American mother and an Ashkenazi Jewish father<ref>{{cite web |url=http://kathleencross.com/lauren-london-exclusive-interview-under-my-skin-part-2/ |title=Lauren London Exclusive Interview: 'Under My Skin (Part 2) |publisher=Kathleen Cross |access-date=February 27, 2014 |archive-url=https://web.archive.org/web/20131012012313/http://kathleencross.com/lauren-london-exclusive-interview-under-my-skin-part-2/ |archive-date=October 12, 2013 |url-status=dead }}</ref> in Los Angeles. After attending Palisades Charter High School into her second year, London was homeschooled.

Career 
2006: Breakthrough with ATL

London appeared in music videos for artists such as Tyrese, Ludacris, Pharrell ("Frontin'") and Snoop Dogg. Her breakout year came in 2006, where she made her television debut in the "Everybody Hates Funerals" episode of the sitcom Everybody Hates Chris. That same year, London landed her first film role as well, playing hip-hop artist T.I.'s romantic lead in the film ATL. For her work, London was nominated for "Best Supporting Actress" at the Black Movie Awards. In 2007, London landed a role on the HBO comedy series Entourage, playing the character Turtle's (Jerry Ferrara) love interest. Based on her performance in ATL, London was given her role in 2007's This Christmas without having to audition. London, along with pop/R&B singers Cassie and Asia Nitollano.  She also became one of the spokesmodels for the Sean John woman's collection in 2007.

In 2008, London landed the role of the character Christina in the first season of the show 90210, originally thought to be a possible romantic interest of Tristan Wilds' character "Dixon Wilson". London's next film role was the character "Ivy" in the 2009 release Next Day Air. That same year, she played the character Cammy Alcott in the Chris Columbus film I Love You, Beth Cooper. London also appeared on the covers of magazines such as King and Jewel.

2011-present: The Game, and Games People Play
London appeared in Tyler Perry's Madea's Big Happy Family, which was released on April 22, 2011. She also made a cameo appearance in the premiere of VH1's Single Ladies. London joined the cast of the hit BET show The Game as a series regular from the sixth season until the series finale. She played a character named Kiera, "a former child star who starred in a Cosby Show-esque sitcom".  London co-starred, alongside Paula Patton, Jill Scott, and Derek Luke, in Baggage Claim (2013), the film adaptation of playwright and director David E. Talbert's 2005 novel. In 2016, London co-starred in the film The Perfect Match as "Ginger". In 2018, London starred in the Lifetime Movies Always & 4Ever and Poinsettias for Christmas.

In 2019, London played the lead character, "Vanessa King", in the BET show Games People Play. In 2021 Lauren starred in the movie Without Remorse. The film was released on Prime Video on April 30, 2021. According to Samba TV, the film was watched in 4.8 million households in its first 30 days of release. In January 2023 London starred in the American comedy film You People on Netflix. London said filming the movie taught her more about her Jewish side of the family.

Personal life
London dated Lil Wayne on and off. The couple's son, Kameron Carter, was born September 9, 2009. In May 2011, London said of her relationship with Wayne, "I met Wayne when I was 15 years old. I've known him a very long time, and we were in a relationship that didn't make it. We tried more than once to revive it, and we were engaged briefly years ago, but we eventually parted ways. People see the 'Lil Wayne' personality and think they know who he really is. My son's father is an intelligent, loving, and lovable person who will always be a dear friend. And that will never change. That is all." Lil Wayne's second verse of the song 'Young'n Blues" explains how he met London and refers to her as "young Cali sweet thang".

London dated Airmiess Asghedom, better known as American rapper Nipsey Hussle, from 2013 until his murder on March 31, 2019. Nipsey and London were thought to have become engaged, but it was later revealed that their engagement photos were for a GQ'' photoshoot. The couple's son Kross Ermias Asghedom was born August 31, 2016.

Filmography

Film

Television

Awards and nominations

See also
 Hip hop models

References

External links

 
 

1984 births
21st-century American actresses
African-American actresses
American film actresses
American people of Jewish descent
American television actresses
Living people
African-American Jews
21st-century African-American women
21st-century African-American people
20th-century African-American people
20th-century African-American women
American Ashkenazi Jews
Year of birth missing (living people)